The 2018 Colorado Rockies season was the franchise's 26th in Major League Baseball and the 24th season the Rockies played their home games at Coors Field. Bud Black returned for his 2nd consecutive season as manager. They won 91 games during the regular season, which was the second-highest mark in franchise history and just one win behind the franchise record set in 2009. They finished the season with a record of 91-71 after losing to the Los Angeles Dodgers in the 2018 National League West tie-breaker game and subsequently opened the postseason by defeating the Chicago Cubs in the Wild Card Game. Their season ended when they were swept by the Milwaukee Brewers in the Division Series.

The Rockies became the first team since the 1922 Philadelphia Phillies to play in four cities against four teams in five days, including the 162nd game of the regular season, NL West tie-breaker, NL Wild Card Game and NLDS Game 1. They also finished with the best road record in franchise history, going 44-38 away from Coors Field.

Offseason
December 8, 2017: Chris Iannetta was signed as a free agent by the Colorado Rockies.
December 15, 2017: Bryan Shaw and Jake McGee was signed as a free agent by the Colorado Rockies.
December 29, 2017: Wade Davis was signed as a free agent by the Colorado Rockies.

Regular season

Season standings

National League West

National League Wild Card

Record vs. opponents

Transactions
July 26, 2018: Seung-hwan Oh was traded by the Toronto Blue Jays to the Colorado Rockies for Chad Spanberger (minors), Forrest Wall (minors), and a player to be named later.  The Colorado Rockies sent Bryan Baker (minors) (August 14, 2018) to the Toronto Blue Jays  to complete the trade.
July 29, 2018: Matt Holliday was signed as a free agent by the Colorado Rockies.
August 31, 2018: Drew Butera was traded by the Kansas City Royals to the Colorado Rockies for Jerry Vasto and cash.

Major League Debuts
Batters
Noel Cuevas (Apr 22)
Garrett Hampson (Jul 21)
Pitchers
Harrison Musgrave (Apr 23)
Sam Howard (Jun 10)
Jerry Vasto (Jun 10)
Yency Almonte (Jun 21)
DJ Johnson (Sep 9)

Roster

Game log 

|- bgcolor="ffbbbb"
|- align="center" bgcolor="ffbbbb"
| 1 || March 29 || @ Diamondbacks || 2–8 || Corbin (1–0) || Gray (0–1) || || 48,703 || 0–1 || L1
|- align="center" bgcolor="ffbbbb"
| 2 || March 30 || @ Diamondbacks || 8–9 || Ray (1–0) || Senzatela (0–1) || Boxberger (1) || 23,937 || 0–2 || L2
|- align="center" bgcolor="bbffbb"
| 3 || March 31 || @ Diamondbacks || 2–1 || Shaw (1–0) || Salas (0–1) || Davis (1) || 33,346 || 1–2 || W1
|-

|- bgcolor="ffbbbb"
|- align="center" bgcolor="bbffbb"
| 4 || April 2 || @ Padres || 7–4 || Bettis (1–0) || Mitchell (0–1) || Davis (2) || 16,899 || 2–2 || W2
|- align="center" bgcolor="ffbbbb"
| 5 || April 3 || @ Padres || 4–8 || Ross (1–0) || Freeland (0–1) || Hand (1) || 19,283 || 2–3 || L1
|- align="center" bgcolor="bbffbb"
| 6 || April 4 || @ Padres || 5–2 || Gray (1–1) || Richard (0–1) || Davis (3) || 19,698 || 3–3 || W1
|- align="center" bgcolor="bbffbb"
| 7 || April 5 || @ Padres || 3–1 || Ottavino (1–0) || Hand (0–2) || Davis (4) || 20,509 || 4–3 || W2
|- align="center" bgcolor="ffbbbb"
| 8 || April 6 || Braves || 3–8 || McCarthy (2–0) || Márquez (0–1) || || 48,216 || 4–4 || L1
|- align="center" bgcolor="bbffbb"
| 9 || April 7 || Braves || 3–2 (10) || Ottavino (2–0) || Vizcaíno (1–1) || || 40,120 || 5–4 || W1
|- align="center" bgcolor="ffbbbb"
| 10 || April 8 || Braves || 0–4 || Newcomb (1–1) || Freeland (0–2) || || 42,031 || 5–5 || L1
|- align="center" bgcolor="ffbbbb"
| 11 || April 9 || Padres || 6–7 || Richard (1–1) || Gray (1–2) || Hand (3) || 20,291 || 5–6 || L2
|- align="center" bgcolor="ffbbbb"
| 12 || April 10 || Padres || 2–5 || Lucchesi (1–0) || Shaw (1–1) || Hand (4) || 22,446 || 5–7 || L3
|- align="center" bgcolor="bbffbb"
| 13 || April 11 || Padres || 6–4 || Senzatela (1–1) || Baumann (0–1) || Davis (5) || 21,248 || 6–7 || W1
|- align="center" bgcolor="bbffbb"
| 14 || April 12 || @ Nationals || 5–1 || Bettis (2–0) || González (1–1) || || 24,213 || 7–7|| W2
|- align="center" bgcolor="bbffbb"
| 15 || April 13 || @ Nationals || 2–1 || Oberg (1–0) || Roark (1–1) || Davis (6) || 32,702 || 8–7 || W3
|- align="center" bgcolor="ffbbbb"
| 16 || April 14 || @ Nationals || 2–6 || Scherzer (3–1) || Gray (1–3) || || 31,700 || 8–8 || L1
|- align="center" bgcolor="bbffbb"
| 17 || April 15 || @ Nationals || 6–5 || Ottavino (3–0) || Doolittle (0–1) || Davis (7) || 25,462 || 9–8 || W1
|- align="center" bgcolor="bbffbb"
| 18 || April 16 || @ Pirates || 6–2 || Márquez (1–1) || Brault (2–1) || || 8,958 || 10–8 || W2
|- align="center" bgcolor="bbffbb"
| 19 || April 17 || @ Pirates || 2–0 || Bettis (3–0) || Williams (3–1) || Davis (8) || 8,869 || 11–8 || W3
|- align="center" bgcolor="ffbbbb"
| 20 || April 18 || @ Pirates || 2–10 || Kuhl (2–1) || Freeland (0–3) || || 8,970 || 11–9 || L1
|- align="center" bgcolor="ffbbbb"
| 21 || April 20 || Cubs || 5–16 || Hendricks (1–1) || Gray (1–4) || || 35,290 || 11–10 || L2
|- align="center" bgcolor="bbffbb"
| 22 || April 21 || Cubs || 5–2 || Anderson (1–0) || Darvish (0–2) || Davis (9) || 40,107 || 12–10 || W1
|- align="center" bgcolor="ffbbbb"
| 23 || April 22 || Cubs || 7–9 || Quintana (2–1) || Márquez (1–2) || Morrow (4) || 48,137 || 12–11 || L1
|- align="center" bgcolor="ffbbbb"
| 24 || April 23 || Padres || 5–13 || Erlin (1–2) || McGee (0–1) || || 24,419 || 12–12 || L2
|- align="center" bgcolor="bbffbb"
| 25 || April 24 || Padres || 8–0 || Freeland (1–3) || Lauer (0–1) || || 23,727 || 13–12 || W1
|- align="center" bgcolor="bbffbb"
| 26 || April 25 || Padres || 5–2 || Gray (2–4) || Ross (2–2) || || 32,989 || 14–12 || W2
|- align="center" bgcolor="bbffbb"
| 27 || April 27 || @ Marlins || 1–0 || Senzatela (2–1) || Ureña (0–4) || Davis (10) || 5,931 || 15–12 || W3
|- align="center" bgcolor="ffbbbb"
| 28 || April 28 || @ Marlins || 1–4 || Chen (1–0) || Márquez (1–3) || Barraclough (1) || 9,659 || 15–13 || L1
|- align="center" bgcolor="ffbbbb"
| 29 || April 29 || @ Marlins || 0–3 || Smith (1–3) || Bettis (3–1) || Ziegler (3) || 11,203 || 15–14 || L2
|- align="center" bgcolor="ffbbbb"
| 30 || April 30 || @ Cubs || 2–3 || Farrell (1–0) || Freeland (1–4) || Cishek (1) || 35,922 || 15–15 || L3
|-

|- bgcolor="ffbbbb"
|- align="center" bgcolor="bbffbb"
| 31 || May 1 || @ Cubs || 3–1 || Gray (3–4) || Hendricks (2–2) || Davis (11) || 40,077 || 16–15 || W1
|- align="center" bgcolor="bbffbb"
| 32 || May 2 || @ Cubs || 11–2 || Anderson (2–0) || Darvish (0–3) || || 32,909 || 17–15 || W2
|- align="center" bgcolor="bbffbb"
| 33 || May 4 || @ Mets || 8–7 || Márquez (2–3) || Wheeler (2–2) || Davis (12) || 34,030 || 18–15 || W3
|- align="center" bgcolor="bbffbb"
| 34 || May 5 || @ Mets || 2–0 || Bettis (4–1) || Matz (1–3) || Davis (13) || 37,550 || 19–15 || W4
|- align="center" bgcolor="bbffbb"
| 35 || May 6 || @ Mets || 3–2 || Freeland (2–4) || Robles (2–1) || Ottavino (1) || 33,580 || 20–15 || W5
|- align="center" bgcolor="bbffbb"
| 36 || May 8 || Angels || 4–2 || Gray (4–4) || Heaney (1–2) || Davis (14) || 33,144 || 21–15 || W6
|- align="center" bgcolor="ffbbbb"
| 37 || May 9 || Angels || 0–8 || Barría (3–1) || Anderson (2–1) || || 33,689 || 21–16 || L1
|- align="center" bgcolor="ffbbbb"
| 38 || May 10 || Brewers || 2–5 || Chacín (3–1) || Márquez (2–4) || Jeffress (3) || 31,093 || 21–17 || L2
|- align="center" bgcolor="ffbbbb"
| 39 || May 11 || Brewers || 10–11 (10) || Jeffress (3–0) || McGee (0–2) || Hader (6) || 36,139 || 21–18 || L3
|- align="center" bgcolor="bbffbb"
| 40 || May 12 || Brewers || 4–0 || Freeland (3–4) || Suter (2–3) || || 35,408 || 22–18 || W1
|- align="center" bgcolor="ffbbbb"
| 41 || May 13 || Brewers || 3–7 || Peralta (1–0) || Gray (4–5) || || 40,453 || 22–19 || L1
|- align="center" bgcolor="bbffbb"
| 42 || May 14 || @ Padres || 6–4 || Anderson (3–1) || Makita (0–1) || Davis (15) || 17,245 || 23–19 || W1
|- align="center" bgcolor="ffbbbb"
| 43 || May 15 || @ Padres || 0–4 || Lyles (1–1) || Márquez (2–5) || Hand (12) || 19,598 || 23–20 || L1
|- align="center" bgcolor="bbffbb"
| 44 || May 17 || @ Giants || 5–3 (12) || McGee (1–2) || Johnson (2–2) || Davis (16) || 37,224 || 24–20 || W1
|- align="center" bgcolor="bbffbb"
| 45 || May 18 || @ Giants || 6–1 || Freeland (4–4) || Holland (2–5) || || 40,970 || 25–20 || W2
|- align="center" bgcolor="ffbbbb"
| 46 || May 19 || @ Giants || 4–9 || Stratton (5–3) || Gray (4–6) || || 39,195 || 25–21 || L1
|- align="center" bgcolor="ffbbbb"
| 47 || May 20 || @ Giants || 5–9 || Dyson (2–0) || Shaw (1–2) || || 40,334 || 25–22 || L2
|- align="center" bgcolor="bbffbb"
| 48 || May 21 || @ Dodgers || 2–1 || Márquez (3–5) || Báez (1–3) || Davis (17) || 42,805 || 26–22 || W1
|- align="center" bgcolor="ffbbbb"
| 49 || May 22 || @ Dodgers || 3–5 || Chargois (2–1) || Shaw (1–3) || Jansen (9) || 43,719 || 26–23 || L1
|- align="center" bgcolor="ffbbbb"
| 50 || May 23 || @ Dodgers || 0–3 || Maeda (4–3) || Freeland (4–5) || Jansen (10) || 45,884 || 26–24 || L2
|- align="center" bgcolor="bbffbb"
| 51 || May 25 || Reds || 5–4 || Gray (5–6) || Romano (2–6) || Davis (18) || 33,193 || 27–24 || W1
|- align="center" bgcolor="ffbbbb"
| 52 || May 26 || Reds || 5–6 || Lorenzen (1–0) || Rusin (0–1) || Hughes (3) || 42,844 || 27–25 || L1
|- align="center" bgcolor="bbffbb"
| 53 || May 27 || Reds || 8–2 || Márquez (4–5) || Harvey (1–3) || || 36,387 || 28–25 || W1
|- align="center" bgcolor="bbffbb"
| 54 || May 28 || Giants || 6–5 (10) || Shaw (2–3) || Strickland (2–2) || || 32,409 || 29–25 || W2
|- align="center" bgcolor="bbffbb"
| 55 || May 29 || Giants || 11–4 || Freeland (5–5) || Samardzija (1–4) || || 27,348 || 30–25 || W3
|- align="center" bgcolor="ffbbbb"
| 56 || May 30 || Giants || 4–7 || Holland (3–6) || Musgrave (0–1) || Strickland (11) || 29,400 || 30–26 || L1
|-

|- bgcolor="ffbbbb"
|- align="center" bgcolor="ffbbbb"
| 57 || June 1 || Dodgers || 8–11 || Santana (1–0) || Pounders (0–1) || Jansen (13) || 42,711 || 30–27 || L2
|- align="center" bgcolor="ffbbbb"
| 58 || June 2 || Dodgers || 4–12 || Báez (2–3) || Shaw (2–4) || || 47,703 || 30–28 || L3
|- align="center" bgcolor="ffbbbb"
| 59 || June 3 || Dodgers || 7–10 || Cingrani (1–2) || Davis (0–1) || Jansen (14) || 41,851 || 30–29 || L4
|- align="center" bgcolor="bbffbb"
| 60 || June 5 || @ Reds || 9–6 || Freeland (6–5) || DeSclafani (0–1) || Davis (19) || 21,944 || 31–29 || W1
|- align="center" bgcolor="bbffbb"
| 61 || June 6 || @ Reds || 6–3 || Gray (6–6) || Romano (3–7) || Davis (20) || 19,762 || 32–29 || W2
|- align="center" bgcolor="ffbbbb"
| 62 || June 7 || @ Reds || 5–7 (13) || Floro (2–1) || Rusin (0–2) || || 15,957 || 32–30 || L1
|- align="center" bgcolor="ffbbbb"
| 63 || June 8 || Diamondbacks || 4–9 || Greinke (5–4) || Márquez (4–6) || || 38,917 || 32–31 || L2
|- align="center" bgcolor="ffbbbb"
| 64 || June 9 || Diamondbacks || 12–7 || Bracho (2–0) || Shaw (2–5) || || 43,197 || 32–32 || L3
|- align="center" bgcolor="ffbbbb"
| 65 || June 10 || Diamondbacks || 8–3 || Godley (6–5) || Freeland (6–6) || || 36,433 || 32–33 || L4
|- align="center" bgcolor="ffbbbb"
| 66 || June 12 || @ Phillies || 5–4 || Nola (8–2) || Gray (6–7) || Domínguez (3) || 19,556 || 32–34 || L5
|- align="center" bgcolor="bbffbb"
| 67 || June 13 || @ Phillies || 7–2 || Anderson (4–1) || Pivetta (4–6) || || 20,075 || 33–34 || W1
|- align="center" bgcolor="ffbbbb"
| 68 || June 14 || @ Phillies || 3–9 || Velasquez (5–7) || Márquez (4–7) || || 22,500 || 33–35 || L1
|- align="center" bgcolor="bbffbb"
| 69 || June 15 || @ Rangers || 9–5 || Bettis (5–1) || Méndez (0–1) || || 30,448 || 34–35 || W1
|- align="center" bgcolor="ffbbbb"
| 70 || June 16 || @ Rangers || 5–2 || Leclerc (2–2) || Musgrave (0–2) || Kela (15) || 23,468 || 34–36 || L1
|- align="center" bgcolor="ffbbbb"
| 71 || June 17 || @ Rangers || 13–12 || Chavez (3–1) || Davis (0–2) || || 25,513 || 34–37 || L2
|- align="center" bgcolor="ffbbbb"
| 72 || June 18 || Mets || 12–2 || deGrom (5–2) || Anderson (4–2) || || 33,815 || 34–38 || L3
|- align="center" bgcolor="bbffbb"
| 73 || June 19 || Mets || 10–8 || Márquez (5–7) || Vargas (2–6) || || 29,710 || 35–38 || W1
|- align="center" bgcolor="bbffbb"
| 74 || June 20 || Mets || 10–8 || Shaw (3–5) || Gsellman (5–2) || Davis (21) || 38,685 || 36–38 || W2
|- align="center" bgcolor="bbffbb"
| 75 || June 21 || Mets || 6–4 || Freeland (7–6) || Matz (3–5) || McGee (1) || 44,010 || 37–38 || W3
|- align="center" bgcolor="bbffbb"
| 76 || June 22 || Marlins || 11–3 || Gray (7–7) || Chen (2–4) || || 35,468 || 38–38 || W4
|- align="center" bgcolor="ffbbbb"
| 77 || June 23 || Marlins || 6–2 || Richards (2–4) || Anderson (4–3) || || 39,032 || 38–39 || L1
|- align="center" bgcolor="ffbbbb"
| 78 || June 24 || Marlins || 8–5 || Rucinski (2–1) || Márquez (5–8) || Barraclough (7) || 34,172 || 38–40 || L2
|- align="center" bgcolor="ffbbbb"
| 79 || June 26 || @ Giants || 3–2 || Watson (2–2) || Ottavino (3–1) || Dyson (3) || 36,070 || 38–41 || L3
|- align="center" bgcolor="ffbbbb"
| 80 || June 27 || @ Giants || 1–0 || Moronta (4–1) || Musgrave (0–3) || || 36,046 || 38–42 || L4
|- align="center" bgcolor="bbffbb"
| 81 || June 28 || @ Giants || 9–8 || Ottavino (4–1) || Dyson (2–2) || Davis (22) || 37,529 || 39–42 || W1
|- align="center" bgcolor="bbffbb"
| 82 || June 29 || @ Dodgers || 3–1 || Anderson (5–3) || Hill (1–3) || Davis (23) || 41,909 || 40–42 || W2
|- align="center" bgcolor="bbffbb"
| 83 || June 30 || @ Dodgers || 3–1 || Márquez (6–8) || Maeda (5–5) || Ottavino (2) || 46,172 || 41–42 || W3
|-

|- bgcolor="ffbbbb"
|- align="center" bgcolor="ffbbbb"
| 84 || July 1 || @ Dodgers || 6–4 || Hudson (3–2) || Ottavino (4–2) || Jansen (22) || 45,725 || 41–43 || L1
|- align="center" bgcolor="bbffbb"
| 85 || July 2 || Giants || 5–2 || Freeland (8–6) || Bumgarner (1–3) || Davis (24) || 40,333 || 42–43 || W1
|- align="center" bgcolor="bbffbb"
| 86 || July 3 || Giants || 8–1 || Senzatela (3–1) || Stratton (8–6) || || 48,072 || 43–43 || W2
|- align="center" bgcolor="bbffbb"
| 87 || July 4 || Giants || 1–0 || Anderson (6–3) || Suarez (3–5) || Davis (25) || 48,158 || 44–43 || W3
|- align="center" bgcolor="bbffbb"
| 88 || July 6 || @ Mariners || 7–1 || Márquez (7–8) || Hernández (8–7) || || 26,554 || 45–43 || W4
|- align="center" bgcolor="bbffbb"
| 89 || July 7 || @ Mariners || 5–1 || Oberg (2–0) || Paxton (8–3) || || || 46–43 || W5
|- align="center" bgcolor="ffbbbb"
| 90 || July 8 || @ Mariners || 6–4 || LeBlanc (5–0) || Senzatela (3–2) || Díaz (35) || 34,440 || 46–44 || L1
|- align="center" bgcolor="ffbbbb"
| 91 || July 10 || Diamondbacks || 5–3 || Delgado (2–0) || McGee (1–3) || Boxberger (22) || 43,405 || 46–45 || L2
|- align="center" bgcolor="bbffbb"
| 92 || July 11 || Diamondbacks || 19–2 || Márquez (8–8) || Miller (0–4) || || 33,919 || 47–45 || W1
|- align="center" bgcolor="bbffbb"
| 93 || July 12 || Diamondbacks || 5–1 || Oberg (3–0) || Ray (3–2) || || 41,410 || 48–45 || W2
|- align="center" bgcolor="bbffbb"
| 94 || July 13 || Mariners || 10–7 || Musgrave (1–3) || Bergman (0–1) || Davis (26) || 38,126 || 49–45 || W3
|- align="center" bgcolor="bbffbb"
| 95 || July 14 || Mariners || 4–1 || Gray (8–7) || LeBlanc (5–1) || Davis (27) || 47,789 || 50–45 || W4
|- align="center" bgcolor="bbffbb"
| 96 || July 15 || Mariners || 4–3 || Oberg (4–0) || Vincent (3–2) || || 35,630 || 51–45 || W5
|- align="center" bgcolor=
|-style="text-align:center; background:#bbcaff;"
|colspan="10"|89th All-Star Game in Washington, D.C.
|- align="center" bgcolor="bbffbb"
| 97 || July 20 || @ Diamondbacks || 11–10 || Oberg (5–0) || Bradley (2–2) || Ottavino (3) || 29,546 || 52–45 || W6
|- align="center" bgcolor="bbffbb"
| 98 || July 21 || @ Diamondbacks || 6–5 || Oberg (6–0) || Hirano (2–2) || Davis (28) || 43,340 || 53–45 || W7
|- align="center" bgcolor="ffbbbb"
| 99 || July 22 || @ Diamondbacks || 6–1 || Greinke (11–5) || Senzatela (3–3) || || 32,985 || 53–46 || L1
|- align="center" bgcolor="ffbbbb"
| 100 || July 24 || Astros || 8–2 (10) || Rondón (2–2) || Davis (0–3) || || 43,184 || 53–47 || L2
|- align="center" bgcolor="bbffbb"
| 101 || July 25 || Astros || 3–2 || Davis (1–3) || McHugh (5–1) || || 40,948 || 54–47 || W1
|- align="center" bgcolor="bbffbb"
| 102 || July 27 || Athletics || 3–1 || Freeland (9–6) || Manaea (9–7) || Ottavino (4) || 40,229 || 55–47 || W2
|- align="center" bgcolor="bbffbb"
| 103 || July 28 || Athletics || 4–1 || Senzatela (4–3) || Anderson (2–3) || Davis (29) || 47,809 || 56–47 || W3
|- align="center" bgcolor="bbffbb"
| 104 || July 29 || Athletics || 3–2 || Márquez (9–8) || Montas (5–3) || Davis (30) || 41,988 || 57–47 || W4
|- align="center" bgcolor="ffbbbb"
| 105 || July 30 || @ Cardinals || 5–4 (10) || Hudson (1–0) || McGee (1–4) || || 41,856 || 57–48 || L1
|- align="center" bgcolor="bbffbb"
| 106 || July 31 || @ Cardinals || 6–3 || Gray (9–7) || Flaherty (4–6) || Davis (31) || 42,636 || 58–48 || W1
|-

|- bgcolor="ffbbbb"
|- align="center" bgcolor="ffbbbb"
| 107 || August 1 || @ Cardinals || 6–3 || Gomber (1–0) || Freeland (9–7) || || 40,544 || 58–49 || L1
|- align="center" bgcolor="ffbbbb"
| 108 || August 2 || @ Cardinals || 3–2 || Shreve (3–2) || Davis (1–4) || || 41,478 || 58–50 || L2
|- align="center" bgcolor="ffbbbb"
| 109 || August 3 || @ Brewers || 5–3 || Burnes (2–0) || Davis (1–5) || || 37,751 || 58–51 || L3
|- align="center" bgcolor="ffbbbb"
| 110 || August 4 || @ Brewers || 8–4 || Peralta (5–2) || Anderson (6–4) || Hader (8) || 40,524 || 58–52 || L4
|- align="center" bgcolor="bbffbb"
| 111 || August 5 || @ Brewers || 5–4 (11) || Oberg (7–0) || Knebel (2–2) || Oh (3) || 37,954 || 59–52 || W1
|- align="center" bgcolor="bbffbb"
| 112 || August 6 || Pirates || 2–0 || Freeland (10–7) || Musgrove (4–6) || Davis (32) || 34,471 || 60–52 || W2
|- align="center" bgcolor="ffbbbb"
| 113 || August 7 || Pirates || 10–2 || Taillon (9–8) || Bettis (5–2) || || 31,649 || 60–53 || L1
|- align="center" bgcolor="ffbbbb"
| 114 || August 8 || Pirates || 4–3 || Archer (4–5) || Márquez (9–9) || Vázquez (26) || 35,702 || 60–54 || L2
|- align="center" bgcolor="ffbbbb"
| 115 || August 9 || Dodgers || 8–5 || Ferguson (3–1) || Davis (1–6) || Alexander (2) || 43,076 || 60–55 || L3
|- align="center" bgcolor="bbffbb"
| 116 || August 10 || Dodgers || 5–4 || McGee (2–4) || Rosscup (0–1) || Ottavino (5) || 42,184 || 61–55 || W1
|- align="center" bgcolor="bbffbb"
| 117 || August 11 || Dodgers || 3–2 || Shaw (4–5) || Chargois (2–4) || || 47,633 || 62–55 || W2
|- align="center" bgcolor="bbffbb"
| 118 || August 12 || Dodgers || 4–3 || Davis (2–6) || Floro (4–3) || || 40,599 || 63–55 || W3
|- align="center" bgcolor="bbffbb"
| 119 || August 14 || @ Astros || 5–1 || Márquez (10–9) || Verlander (11–8) || || 35,813 || 64–55 || W4
|- align="center" bgcolor="ffbbbb"
| 120 || August 15 || @ Astros || 12–1 || Cole (11–5) || Anderson (6–5) || || 29,967 || 64–56 || L1
|- align="center" bgcolor="bbffbb"
| 121 || August 16 || @ Braves || 5–3 || Oh (5–3) || Brach (1–3) || Davis (33) || 23,428 || 65–56 || W1
|- align="center" bgcolor="bbffbb"
| 122 || August 17 || @ Braves || 11–5 || Freeland (11–7) || Newcomb (10–6) || || 28,964 || 66–56 || W2
|- align="center" bgcolor="bbffbb"
| 123 || August 18 || @ Braves || 5–3 (10) || Ottavino (5–2) || Jackson (1–1) || Davis (34) || 42,143 || 67–56 || W3
|- align="center" bgcolor="bbffbb"
| 124 || August 19 || @ Braves || 4–2 || Márquez (11–9) || Sánchez (6–4) || Davis (35) || 33,942 || 68–56 || W4
|- align="center" bgcolor="ffbbbb"
| 125 || August 21 || Padres || 4–3 || Erlin (3–3) || Anderson (6–6) || Yates (5) || 27,862 || 68–57 || L1
|- align="center" bgcolor="bbffbb"
| 126 || August 22 || Padres || 6–2 || Gray (10–7) || Nix (1–2) || || 28,966 || 69–57 || W1
|- align="center" bgcolor="bbffbb"
| 127 || August 23 || Padres || 4–3 || Rusin (1–2) || Yates (4–3) || || 30,625 || 70–57 || W2
|- align="center" bgcolor="ffbbbb"
| 128 || August 24 || Cardinals || 7–5 || Martínez (7–6) || Senzatela (4–4) || Norris (27) || 43,578 || 70–58 || L1
|- align="center" bgcolor="bbffbb"
| 129 || August 25 || Cardinals || 9–1 || Ottavino (6–2) || Hudson (4–1) || || 47,785 || 71–58 || W1
|- align="center" bgcolor="ffbbbb"
| 130 || August 26 || Cardinals || 12–3 || Gomber (4–0) || Anderson (6–7) || || 41,235 || 71–59 || L1
|- align="center" bgcolor="ffbbbb"
| 131 || August 27 || @ Angels || 10–7 || Johnson (5–3) || Ottavino (6–3) || Ramirez (1) || 35,305 || 71–60 || L2
|- align="center" bgcolor="bbffbb"
| 132 || August 28 || @ Angels || 3–2 || Freeland (12–7) || Ramirez (4–5) || Davis (36) || 35,207 || 72–60 || W1
|- align="center" bgcolor="ffbbbb"
| 133 || August 30 || @ Padres || 3–2 (13) || Stock (1–1) || Shaw (4–6) || || 20,056 || 72–61 || L1
|- align="center" bgcolor="ffbbbb"
| 134 || August 31 || @ Padres || 7–0 || Kennedy (1–2) || Senzatela (4–5) || || 21,408 || 72–62 || L2
|-

|- bgcolor="ffbbbb"
|- align="center" bgcolor="bbffbb"
| 135 || September 1 || @ Padres || 4–2 || Gray (11–7) || Erlin (3–5) || Davis (37) || 35,779 || 73–62 || W1
|- align="center" bgcolor="bbffbb"
| 136 || September 2 || @ Padres || 7–3 || Freeland (13–7) || Nix (2–3) || || 28,883 || 74–62 || W2
|- align="center" bgcolor="bbffbb"
| 137 || September 3 || Giants || 9–8 || Oh (6–3) || Watson (4–6) || Davis (38) || 43,256 || 75–62 || W3
|- align="center" bgcolor="bbffbb"
| 138 || September 4 || Giants || 6–2 || Rusin (2–2) || Moronta (5–2) || || 24,727 || 76–62 || W4
|- align="center" bgcolor="bbffbb"
| 139 || September 5 || Giants || 5–3 || Musgrave (2–3) || Suarez (6–10) || Ottavino (6) || 24,790 || 77–62 || W5
|- align="center" bgcolor="ffbbbb"
| 140 || September 7 || Dodgers || 4–2 || Kershaw (7–5) || Rusin (2–3) || Maeda (2) || 41,547 || 77–63 || L1
|- align="center" bgcolor="bbffbb"
| 141 || September 8 || Dodgers || 4–2 || Freeland (14–7) || Buehler (6–5) || Davis (39) || 47,867 || 78–63 || W1
|- align="center" bgcolor="ffbbbb"
| 142 || September 9 || Dodgers || 9–6 || Hill (8–5) || Anderson (6–8) || Alexander (3) || 40,157 || 78–64 || L1
|- align="center" bgcolor="bbffbb"
| 143 || September 10 || Diamondbacks || 13–2 || Márquez (12–9) || Godley (14–9) || || 25,114 || 79–64 || W1
|- align="center" bgcolor="ffbbbb"
| 144 || September 11 || Diamondbacks || 6–3 || Greinke (14–9) || Senzatela (4–6) || Hirano (1) || 26,510 || 79–65 || L1
|- align="center" bgcolor="bbffbb"
| 145 || September 12 || Diamondbacks || 5–4 || Davis (3–6) || Hirano (4–3) || || 31,687 || 80–65 || W1
|- align="center" bgcolor="bbffbb"
| 146 || September 13 || Diamondbacks || 10–3 || Freeland (15–7) || Koch (5–5) || || 31,783 || 81–65 || W2
|- align="center" bgcolor="ffbbbb"
| 147 || September 14 || @ Giants || 2–0 || Stratton (10–9) || Anderson (6–9) || || 37,800 || 81–66 || L1
|- align="center" bgcolor="ffbbbb"
| 148 || September 15 || @ Giants || 3–0 || Bumgarner (6–6) || Márquez (12–10) || Smith (12) || 38,204 || 81–67 || L2
|- align="center" bgcolor="bbffbb"
| 149 || September 16 || @ Giants || 3–2 || Senzatela (5–6) || Rodríguez (6–4) || Davis (40) || 38,824 || 82–67 || W1
|- align="center" bgcolor="ffbbbb"
| 150 || September 17 || @ Dodgers || 8–2 || Ryu (5–3)  || Gray (11–8) ||  || 45,970 || 82–68 || L1
|- align="center" bgcolor="ffbbbb"
| 151 || September 18 || @ Dodgers || 3–2 (10) || Floro (6–3) || Ottavino (6–4) ||  || 49,537 || 82–69 || L2
|- align="center" bgcolor="ffbbbb"
| 152 || September 19 || @ Dodgers || 5–2 || Ferguson (8–5) || Oberg (7–1) || Jansen (36) || 50,141 || 82–70 || L3
|- align="center" bgcolor="bbffbb"
| 153 || September 21 || @ Diamondbacks || 6–2 || Márquez (13–10) || Greinke (14–11) ||  || 28,833 || 83–70 || W1
|- align="center" bgcolor="bbffbb"
| 154 || September 22 || @ Diamondbacks || 5–1 || Senzatela (6–6) || Corbin (11–7) ||  || 35,094 || 84–70 || W2
|- align="center" bgcolor= "bbffbb"
| 155 || September 23 || @ Diamondbacks || 2–0 || Freeland (16–7) || Godley (14–11) || Davis (41) || 29,191 ||  85–70 || W3
|- align="center" bgcolor="bbffbb"
| 156 || September 24 || Phillies || 10–1 || Gray (12–8) || Eflin (11–8) || || 30,336 || 86–70 || W4
|- align="center" bgcolor="bbffbb"
| 157 || September 25 || Phillies || 10–3 || Johnson (1–0) || Velasquez (9–12) || || 30,217 || 87–70 || W5
|- align="center" bgcolor="bbffbb"
| 158 || September 26 || Phillies || 14–0 || Márquez (14–10) || Pivetta (7–14) || || 35,181 || 88–70 || W6
|- align="center" bgcolor="bbffbb"
| 159 || September 27 || Phillies || 5–3 || Oberg (8–1) || Arrieta (10–11) || Davis (42) || 36,448 || 89–70 || W7
|- align="center" bgcolor="bbffbb"
| 160 || September 28 || Nationals || 5–2 || Freeland (17–7) || Ross (0–2) || Davis (43) || 48,089  || 90–70 || W8
|- align="center" bgcolor="ffbbbb"
| 161 || September 29 || Nationals || 2–12 || Strasburg (10–7) || Gray (12–9) || || 47,781 || 90–71 || L1
|- align="center" bgcolor="bbffbb"
| 162 || September 30 || Nationals || 12–0 || Anderson (7–9) || Fedde (2–4) || || 47,833 || 91–71 || W1
|- align="center" bgcolor="ffbbbb"
| 163 || October 1 || @ Dodgers  || 2–5 || Buehler (8–5)  ||Márquez (14–11) || — ||47,816 || 91–72 || L1
|-

|- style="text-align:center;"
| Legend:       = Win       = Loss       = PostponementBold = Rockies team member

Postseason

Game Log

|- align="center" bgcolor="bbffbb"
| 1 || October 2 || @ Cubs || 2–1 (13) || Oberg (1–0)  || Hendricks (0–1) || — || 40,151 || 1–0
|-

|- align="center" bgcolor="ffbbbb"
| 1 || October 4 || @ Brewers || 2–3 (10) || Soria (1–0) || Ottavino (0–1) || — || 43,382 || 0–1
|- align="center" bgcolor="ffbbbb"
| 2 || October 5 || @ Brewers || 0–4 || Chacín (1–0) || Anderson (0–1) || — || 44,547 || 0–2
|- align="center" bgcolor="ffbbbb"
| 3 || October 7 || Brewers || 0–6 || Burnes (1–0) ||Márquez (0–1) || — || 40,658 || 0–3
|-

Postseason rosters

| style="text-align:left" |
Pitchers: 0 Adam Ottavino 18 Seung-hwan Oh 21 Kyle Freeland 45 Scott Oberg 49 Antonio Senzatela 51 Jake McGee 52 Chris Rusin 59 Harrison Musgrave 63 D. J. Johnson 71 Wade Davis
Catchers: 14 Tony Wolters 16 Drew Butera 22 Chris Iannetta  
Infielders: 1 Garrett Hampson 4 Pat Valaika 9 DJ LeMahieu 20 Ian Desmond 24 Ryan McMahon 27 Trevor Story 28 Nolan Arenado 
Outfielders: 5 Carlos González 7 Matt Holliday 8 Gerardo Parra 19 Charlie Blackmon 26 David Dahl 
|- valign="top"

| style="text-align:left" |
Pitchers: 0 Adam Ottavino 18 Seung-hwan Oh 21 Kyle Freeland 35 Chad Bettis 44 Tyler Anderson 45 Scott Oberg 48 Germán Márquez 49 Antonio Senzatela 52 Chris Rusin 59 Harrison Musgrave 63 D. J. Johnson 71 Wade Davis
Catchers: 14 Tony Wolters 22 Chris Iannetta
Infielders: 1 Garrett Hampson 9 DJ LeMahieu 20 Ian Desmond 24 Ryan McMahon 27 Trevor Story 28 Nolan Arenado
Outfielders: 5 Carlos González 7 Matt Holliday 8 Gerardo Parra 19 Charlie Blackmon 26 David Dahl
|- valign="top"

Player stats

Batting

Starters by position 
Note: Pos = Position; G = Games played; AB = At bats; H = Hits; Avg. = Batting average; HR = Home runs; RBI = Runs batted in

Other batters 
Note: G = Games played; AB = At bats; H = Hits; Avg. = Batting average; HR = Home runs; RBI = Runs batted in

Pitching

Starting pitchers 
Note: G = Games pitched; IP = Innings pitched; W = Wins; L = Losses; ERA = Earned run average; SO = Strikeouts

Other pitchers 
Note: G = Games pitched; IP = Innings pitched; W = Wins; L = Losses; ERA = Earned run average; SO = Strikeouts

Relief pitchers 
Note: G = Games pitched; W = Wins; L = Losses; SV = Saves; ERA = Earned run average; SO = Strikeouts

Farm system

References

External links
2018 Colorado Rockies season Official Site
2018 Colorado Rockies season at Baseball Reference

Colorado Rockies seasons
Colorado Rockies
Colorado Rockies
2010s in Denver